The Töss is a river of the canton of Zürich.

The Vordertöss (lit.: 'Front Töss') rises on the south side of the Tössstock on the north faces of the Schwarzeberg and Höchhand before it circumvent the Tössstock on its western flank.

The larger tributary, the Hindertöss (lit.: 'Back Töss') collects the waters, either, by its tributary, the Chreuelbach, below the Höchhand, the western faces of the Habrütispitz and Rossegg, or, from its own sources below Schindelegg, and the south faces of Schindelberghöchi and the Dägelschberg, and passes the Tössstock on its northern hillside.

The Töss flows to the north before it meets the main valley of its own name, Töss Valley (Tösstal) just before Steg im Tösstal. Here, the river and its valley turns to the west in order to flow through Bauma then turns to the north again. West of the village Turbenthal it turns west again, and the valley gets even more ragged than before.

It traverses Winterthur on its most western part of the city, just northeast of the Töss, a city mountain.

References 

Rivers of Switzerland
Rivers of the canton of Zürich